Leave to enter is permission for entry to the United Kingdom granted by British immigration officers.

According to the Immigration Rules, a person who is not a British citizen, an Irish citizen or a Commonwealth citizen with the right of abode in the UK, requires leave to enter the United Kingdom.

Leave to enter grants a person subject to immigration control permission to enter Britain for a limited period only, subject to a number of conditions:

a restriction on employment or occupation in the United Kingdom;
a condition requiring the person to maintain and accommodate himself, and any dependants of his, without recourse to public funds; and
a condition requiring the person to register with the police.

The time limit of any leave to enter depends upon individual circumstances and is provided to the applicant in person.

A person who has been granted leave to enter does not necessarily have the automatic right to enter Britain. The ultimate decision of entry is made by an immigration officer at the port of entry under paragraph 2A of Schedule 2 to the Immigration Act 1971.

Leave to enter is required at any point of entry, including through the Channel Tunnel.

Leave outside the Immigration Rules 

On their discretion, the Secretary of State has the power to grant leave outside the Immigration Rules (LOTR) from the residual discretion under the Immigration Act 1971.

LOTR on compelling compassionate grounds may be granted where the decision maker decides that the specific circumstances of the case includes exceptional circumstances. These circumstances will mean that a refusal would result in unjustifiably harsh consequences for the applicant or their family, but which do not render refusal a breach of ECHR Article 8, Article 3, refugee convention or other obligations.

See also
Visa policy of the United Kingdom

References

Notes

Human migration
Immigration to the United Kingdom
International travel documents